The Manfredi were a noble family of northern Italy, who, with some interruptions, held the seigniory of the city of Faenza in Romagna from the beginning of the 14th century to the end of the 15th century. The family also held the seigniory of Imola for several decades at the same time.

The first mention of the Manfredi family in Faenza is dated 1050. The family members were patricians of the city and consuls. The first Manfredi lord of Faenza was Francesco I Manfredi, son of Alberghetto and the last was Astorre Manfredi IV.

Manfredi family members who were Lords of Faenza

    Francesco I Manfredi 1319–1327
    Albergheto I Manfredi 1327–1328
    From 1328 to 1339 Faenza was under the rule of the Papal State
    Riccardo Manfredi 1339–1340
    Francesco I Manfredi (second term) 1340–1341
    Giovanni Manfredi 1341–1356
    From 1356 to 1379 Faenza was under the rule of the Papal State
    Astorre I Manfredi 1379–1404
    From 1404 to 1410 Faenza was under the rule of the Papal State
    Gian Galeazzo I Manfredi 1410–1416
    Carlo I Manfredi 1416–1420
    Guidantonio Manfredi 1420–1443
    Astorre II Manfredi 1443–1468 (conjointly with Gian Galeazzo II)
    Gian Galeazzo II Manfredi 1443–1465 (conjointly with Astorre II)
    Carlo II Manfredi 1468–1477
    Galeotto Manfredi 1440–1488 (poisoned by his wife Francesca Bentivoglio)
    Astorre III Manfredi 1488–1501
    From 1501 to 1503 Faenza was ruled by César Borgia
    Astorre IV Manfredi 1503, (last Manfredi to rule Faenza)

Manfredi family members who were Lords of Imola

    Guidantonio Manfredi 1439–1441
    Astorre II Manfredi 1441–1448
    Taddeo Manfredi 1448–1473

References
 based on equivalent article on French Wikipedia

Bibliography
  Piero Zama, I Manfredi, signori di Faenza, Fratelli Lega Editori, Faenza, 1954